Anastasia Sergeyevna Dmitrieva (born 21 January 1999 in Tolyatti, Samara) is a senior elite Russian gymnast. She was a member of the Russian National Team from 2012–16.

Junior career

2012

Dmitrieva made her international debut at the International Gymnix in 2012, winning team gold and placing ninth on floor exercise. She competed at the Voronin Cup in December, but did not place in the all-around because the "two-per-country" rule was in place, and did not make the event finals.

2013

She returned to the International Gymnix in 2013, winning team and all-around gold, uneven bars bronze, and placing fourth on vault, and fifth on floor. She competed at the Russian Junior Championships, winning balance beam gold, team, all-around, and vault silver, and placing fourth on bars. At the end of the year, she competed at the Gymnasiade, winning team gold.

2014

She competed at the Russian Championships in April, winning silver on floor, bronze with her team, on vault, and beam, and placing fifth on the all-around and eighth on bars.

Dmitrieva became a senior elite gymnast in 2015.

Competitive history

References

External links
Russian Gymnastics Profile

1999 births
Living people
Russian female artistic gymnasts
Junior artistic gymnasts
Sportspeople from Tolyatti
21st-century Russian women